Eduardo Blanco (1838–1912), Venezuelan writer and politician, was aide-de-camp to General José Antonio Páez, independence hero and first president of Venezuela after the breakup of Gran Colombia in 1830.

Biography

His main work is Venezuela Heroica (1881), a classic romantic view of history as an epic. Venezuela heroica is structured in five vignettes that depict the main battles and heroes of the Venezuelan War of Independence. It was from General Páez himself that Blanco heard the stories of the Battle of Carabobo, during an encounter with Marshal Juan Crisóstomo Falcón to end the Federal War (1859–1863) near the site of the battle. Páez was so moved from his memories of youth, the anecdote goes, that he could not stop telling his aide the details of the battle. It was Falcón who then told Blanco "you are listening to the Iliad from the very lips of Achilles".

Blanco is also the author of Zárate (1882), a historical novel that attempts to make sense of national reality; Zárate marks the beginning of the "criollista" movement in Venezuelan literature.

Eduado Blanco was minister of foreign affairs for the government of Cipriano Castro (1899–1908).

Family and legacy
He is an uncle of Rufino Blanco-Fombona and great-great-grandfather of María Corina Machado.

See also
List of Ministers of Foreign Affairs of Venezuela

References

 

 

1838 births
1912 deaths
19th-century Venezuelan historians
19th-century Venezuelan novelists
20th-century Venezuelan novelists
Venezuelan male writers
Male novelists
Venezuelan Ministers of Foreign Affairs
Writers from Caracas
Education ministers of Venezuela